Club Deportivo Burriana is a Spanish football team based in Burriana, in the autonomous community of Valencia. Founded in 1949, it plays in Tercera División – Group 6, holding home games at Estadio Municipal San Fernando, with a 4,000-seat capacity.

Season to season

1 season in Segunda División B
28 seasons in Tercera División

Famous players

External links
Official website 
Futbolme.com profile
FFCV team profile 

Football clubs in the Valencian Community
Association football clubs established in 1949
1949 establishments in Spain